The 1997–1998 session was a former session of the California State Legislature.

Dates of sessions

Major events

Major legislation

Enacted

Pending or failed

Vetoed

Members
Skip to Assembly, below

Senate

Assembly
Democrats: 43
Republicans: 37

Officers
Speaker Antonio Villaraigosa (D-45) from February 26, 1998
Cruz Bustamante (D-31) to February 26, 1998
Speaker pro Tempore Sheila Kuehl (D-41)
Majority Floor Leader Kevin Shelley (D-12)
Minority Floor Leader Rod Pacheco (R-64) from November 5, 1998
Bill Leonard (R-63) to November 5, 1998
Chief Clerk  E. Dotson Wilson
Sergeant at Arms  Ronald Pane
Note: The Chief Clerk and the Sergeant at Arms are not Members of the Legislature

Analysis of Bills

The party affiliation and district numbers of Assembly members are listed after their names in this list.

See also
 List of California state legislatures

1997-1998
1997 in California
1998 in California
California
California